The Lebanese Swimming Federation (LSF) is the national governing body of swimming in Lebanon, founded in 1961.

The LSF is an active member of the International Swimming Federation (FINA) and the Asia Swimming Federation (AASF). Nationally, it is affiliated to the Lebanese Olympic Committee. It operates in conformity with the organization’s charter accepted by FINA and AASF. It was established in 1947.

Lebanese swimming federation has the responsibility for elite performance, doping control and international relationships and events for the sports within Lebanon.

For the first time in history, a Lebanese swimming team attended the 1968 Summer Olympics held in Mexico, with one male swimmer attending the event (Yacoub Masboungi). The first female Lebanese swimmer to attend an Olympics was Ani Jane Mugrditchian, at the 1972 Summer Olympics in Munich.

In August 2004, Omar Daaboul tested positive for the androgen and anabolic steroids methandienone, methyltestosterone and norandrosterone in an in-competition control. He was subsequently handed a two-year ban from the sport until 2006.

Board of directors

See also 
 List of Lebanese records in swimming
 Lebanese Swimming at the Olympics

References

Swimming in Lebanon
National members of the Asian Swimming Federation